National holiday may refer to:
General strike, a mass work stoppage as part of an industrial dispute
National day, a day when a nation celebrates a very important event in its history, such as its establishment
Public holiday, a holiday established by law, usually a day off for at least a portion of the workforce, such as public-sector employees

See also
 Fête nationale